The 2022 Henderson Tennis Open was a professional tennis tournament played on outdoor hard courts. It was the thirteenth edition of the tournament which was part of the 2022 ITF Women's World Tennis Tour. It took place in Las Vegas, United States between 10 and 16 October 2022.

Champions

Singles

  Yuan Yue def.  Diana Shnaider, 4–6, 6–3, 6–1

Doubles

  Carmen Corley /  Ivana Corley def.  Katarina Kozarov /  Veronica Miroshnichenko, 6–2, 6–0

Singles main draw entrants

Seeds

 1 Rankings are as of 3 October 2022.

Other entrants
The following players received wildcards into the singles main draw:
  Raveena Kingsley
  Rasheeda McAdoo
  Anna Rogers
  Yanina Wickmayer

The following players received entry from the qualifying draw:
  Solymar Colling
  Carmen Corley
  Hsu Chieh-yu
  Tori Kinard
  Katarina Kozarov
  Veronica Miroshnichenko
  Aldila Sutjiadi
  Lisa Zaar

References

External links
 2022 Henderson Tennis Open at ITFtennis.com
 Official website

2022 ITF Women's World Tennis Tour
2022 in American tennis
October 2022 sports events in the United States